The 2008 Tennis Channel Open was a men's tennis tournament played on outdoor hard courts. It was the 21st edition of the Tennis Channel Open, and was part of the International Series of the 2008 ATP Tour. It took place at The Amanda & Stacy Darling Memorial Tennis Center in Las Vegas, Nevada, United States, from March 3 through March 9, 2008.

The singles field featured Viña del Mar champion Fernando González, former World No. 1 and 2007 Cincinnati Masters semifinalist Lleyton Hewitt, and Marseille semifinalist Marcos Baghdatis. Other top seeds competing were 2007 Metz semifinalist Guillermo Cañas, Buenos Aires and Acapulco quarterfinalist Potito Starace, Michaël Llodra, Robin Söderling and Nicolas Kiefer.

Unseeded Sam Querrey won the singles title.

Finals

Singles

 Sam Querrey defeated  Kevin Anderson, 4–6, 6–3, 6–4
It was Querrey's first singles title of his career.

Doubles

 Julien Benneteau /  Michaël Llodra defeated  Bob Bryan /  Mike Bryan, 6–4, 4–6, [10–8]

See also
 Las Vegas Challenger

References

External links
 ITF tournament edition details
 Singles draw
 Doubles draw